Ibrahim Adel Ali Mohamed Hassan (born 23 April 2001), is an Egyptian professional footballer who plays for Egyptian Premier League side Pyramids as a winger.

References

2001 births
Living people
People from Port Said
Sportspeople from Port Said
Egyptian footballers
Association football wingers
Egyptian Premier League players
Pyramids FC players
Egypt youth international footballers
Footballers at the 2020 Summer Olympics
Olympic footballers of Egypt